Petelo Hanisi is a Wallisian politician and former member of the Territorial Assembly of Wallis and Futuna. He was president of the Territorial Assembly of Wallis and Futuna from 2013 to 2014.

He lost his seat at the 2017 Wallis and Futuna Territorial Assembly election.

References

Living people
Wallis and Futuna politicians
Presidents of the Territorial Assembly of Wallis and Futuna
Year of birth missing (living people)